Viktor Krauss is an American musician who plays acoustic and electric bass. He has released solo albums and has worked as a sideman with many musicians, including his sister, singer and fiddler Alison Krauss.

Music career
Krauss was born to Fred and Louise, and raised in Champaign, Illinois. As a boy, he enjoyed listening to soundtracks. He started on piano and trumpet before moving on to playing double bass with local jazz groups in his early teens. In high school, he began composing music and was influenced by rock, soul, and R&B. He attended the University of Illinois at Urbana-Champaign and studied bass, voice, and electronic music. While in college, he formed a band called Difficult Listening.

In 1992, he became a member of the Free Mexican Airforce led by Peter Rowan, a bluegrass guitarist and singer from Boston. After working with Rowan, he joined the band of country singer Lyle Lovett, touring and recording for the next ten years. He played on Forget About It, a solo album by his sister, Alison.

He recorded his album Far from Enough (Nonesuch, 2004) with Alison, dobro player Jerry Douglas, drummer Steve Jordan, and guitarist Bill Frisell. Alison sings a cover version of the song "Big Log" by Robert Plant. Viktor Krauss called his album a soundtrack without a movie. It combines country, bluegrass, and jazz. His second album, II (EMI/Back Porch, 2007), was also compared to a film soundtrack. Shawn Colvin sings a cover version of "Shine On You Crazy Diamond" by Pink Floyd.

Krauss has worked as a session musician on albums by the Cox Family, Beth Nielsen Chapman, Bill Frisell, Jerry Douglas, Kenny Rogers, Dolly Parton, Martin Taylor, Michael McDonald, and Natalie MacMaster. He is also the composer of the indie horror game No Players Online.

Discography
 Different Strokes (Fiddle Tunes, 1985)
 Far from Enough (Nonesuch, 2004)
 II (EMI/Back Porch, 2007)

As sideman
With Alison Krauss
 1995 Now That I've Found You: A Collection
 1999 Forget About It
 2007 A Hundred Miles or More: A Collection

With the Cox Family
 1994 I Know Who Holds Tomorrow with Alison Krauss
 1993 Everybody's Reaching Out for Someone
 1995 Beyond the City
 1996 Just When We're Thinking It's Over
 2015 Gone Like the Cotton

With Bill Frisell
 1997 Nashville (Nonesuch)
 1998 Gone, Just Like a Train (Nonesuch)
 1999 Good Dog, Happy Man (Nonesuch)
 1999 The Sweetest Punch (Decca)
 2005 East/West (Nonesuch)
 2007 Floratone (Blue Note)
 2009 Disfarmer (Nonesuch)

With Jerry Douglas
 1998 Restless on the Farm
 2002 Lookout for Hope
 2005 The Best Kept Secret
 2012 Traveler

With Lyle Lovett
 1998 Step Inside This House
 1999 Live in Texas
 2000 Dr. T & the Women
 2003 My Baby Don't Tolerate
 2003 Smile
 2007 It's Not Big It's Large
 2012 Release Me
 2009 Natural Forces

With Beth Nielsen Chapman
 2002 Deeper Still
 2005 Look
 2007 Prism

With Dolly Parton
 1994 Heartsongs: Live from Home
 2005 Those Were the Days

With Jill Sobule
 1995 Jill Sobule
 1997 Happy Town

With Natalie MacMaster
 1999 In My Hands
 2003 Blueprint

With Ron Block
 2001 Faraway Land
 2007 DoorWay

With Peter Rowan
 1994 Tree on a Hill
 2006 Crucial Country

With Jason White
 2001 Shades of Gray
 2003 Tonight's Top Story

With Carrie Rodriguez
 2006 Seven Angels on a Bicycle
 2016 Lola

With  Sarah Jarosz
 2011 Follow Me Down
 2013 Build Me Up from Bones

With  Nicole C. Mullen
 2000 Nicole C. Mullen
 2001 Talk About It
 2008 Gift Tin

With others
 1995 Departure, Michael Johnson
 1995 In a Quiet Room, Dan Seals
 1997 Blue Obsession, Michael McDonald
 1998 Howlin' at the Moon, Sam Bush
 1999 Family Tree, Darrell Scott
 1999 The Crossing, Tim O'Brien
 1999 The Luxury of Time, David Mead
 2000 Crazy as Me, Robert Lee Castleman
 2000 The Beautiful Game, Acoustic Alchemy
 2002 Down the Old Plank Road, The Chieftains
 2002 Hey Y'all, Elizabeth Cook
 2004 Between Here and Gone, Mary Chapin Carpenter
 2004 Deja Vu All Over Again, John Fogerty
 2004 Just Like There's Nothin' to It, Steve Forbert
 2004 Lone Starry Night, John Arthur Martinez
 2004 One Moment More, Mindy Smith
 2004 Passing Through, Randy Travis
 2005 Say What You Feel, Paul Brady
 2006 3D, Casey Driessen
 2007 South of Delia, Richard Shindell
 2007 When at Last, Russ Barenberg
 2008 In Time, Danny O'Keefe
 2009 Not Far Now, Richard Shindell
 2009 The Near Demise of the High Wire Dancer, Antje Duvekot
 2009 The Scorpion in the Story, Tori Sparks
 2009 Time to Grow, Lovell Sisters
 2011 A Natural History, J. D. Souther
 2011 Anniversary Celebration, Randy Travis
 2011 City of Refuge, Abigail Washburn
 2011 Mesabi, Tom Russell
 2011 Tennessee: The Nashville Sessions, Russell Hitchcock
 2011 Until Morning/Come Out of the Dark, Tori Sparks
 2011 Weights & Wings, Matt Wertz
 2012 All Fall Down, Shawn Colvin
 2012 Hello Cruel World, Gretchen Peters
 2001 Nitelife, Martin Taylor
 2011 Crazy Little Things, Lynda Carter
 2013 Every Man Should Know, Harry Connick Jr.
 2013 The Living Room Sessions, B. J. Thomas
 2012 Amazing Grace, Kenny Rogers
 2014 Sixty, John Cowan
 2015 That Lovin' Feeling, Steve Tyrell
 2016 Turns to Gold, Gabe Dixon
 2016 Corazones (Omar Rodríguez-López album), Omar Rodríguez-López

References

External links
 Official site

1969 births
Living people
American country singer-songwriters
Musicians from Champaign, Illinois
American double-bassists
Male double-bassists
Nonesuch Records artists
Guitarists from Illinois
20th-century American bass guitarists
Country musicians from Illinois
21st-century double-bassists
20th-century American male musicians
21st-century American male musicians
American male singer-songwriters
Singer-songwriters from Illinois
Lyle Lovett and His Large Band members